The Roland JV-1080 ( Super JV, Super JV-1080, or simply 1080) is a sample-based synthesizer/sound module in the form of a 2U rack. The JV-1080's synthesizer engine was also used in Roland's XP-50 workstation (1995). Due to its library of high-quality sounds and multi-timbral capabilities, it became a mainstay with film composers.

Features
The JV-1080 features a 64-Voice Polyphony, as well as 16-part Multi-timbral capabilities. From the factory, the JV-1080 comes with hundreds of patches, and several rhythm kits (8 megabytes total). It can be expanded with up to 4 SR-JV80 expansion cards, as well as a PCM and Data card, to provide up to 42 megabytes.

Factory Sounds
The core sampled waveforms of the JV-1080 were developed by Roland R&D-LA in Culver City, California.

Many of the most well-known Factory presets and Xpansion board sounds of the JV-series were created by Eric Persing of Spectrasonics and Ace Yukawa.

Notable users

 808 State
 Arthur Baker
 Bradley Joseph
 Dario G
 Depeche Mode
 Dubstar
 Eliot Kennedy
 Gary Barlow
 Hans Zimmer
 Ihsahn
 Jens Gad
 Jens Johansson
 Jerry Martin
 Jack L. Stroem
 Keith Zizza
 Kenji Kawai
 Leigh Dickson
 Luis Delgado
 Michael Cretu
 Microesfera
 Nathan McCree
 Liz Kitchen
 Francis Haines
 Kim Goody and Alan Coates
 Philip Pope
 Barrie Bignold
 KICK Productions Ltd
 Andre Jacquemin
 Dave Howman
 Keith Hopwood
 Foss Patterson
 Paul Van Dyk
 Ping Pong
 Rhythm Plate
 Tony Banks
 Vangelis
 Vince Clarke
 Tame Impala
 Cubensis
 Jamn Ensemble
 Zûg
 Grant Kirkhope
 RMB
 Paul Shaffer

Expansion Cards 
The SR-JV80 expansion cards can be used in the Roland XP-50, XP-60, XP-80, JV-1080 and XV-5080, which can each hold four expansion cards, as well as the JV-2080, which can hold eight expansion cards.

The three Experience expansion boards contain a selection of sounds from different expansion boards in a single card.

 SR-JV80-01: Pop
 SR-JV80-02: Orchestral
 SR-JV80-03: Piano
 SR-JV80-04: Vintage Synth
 SR-JV80-05: World
 SR-JV80-06: Dance* 
 SR-JV80-07: Super Sound Set
 SR-JV80-08: Keyboards of the 60s & 70s
 SR-JV80-09: Session
 SR-JV80-10: Bass and Drums
 SR-JV80-11: Techno
 SR-JV80-12: Hip-Hop
 SR-JV80-13: Vocal
 SR-JV80-14: Asia
 SR-JV80-15: Special FX
 SR-JV80-16: Orchestral II
 SR-JV80-17: Country
 SR-JV80-18: Latin World
 SR-JV80-19: House
 SR-JV80-97: Experience III
 SR-JV80-98: Experience II
 SR-JV80-99: Experience

Notice: Due to copyright problems Roland no longer distributes the Dance expansion board.

References

Further reading

External links
 Roland JV-1080 – official product page
 JV-1080 page at VintageSynth
 JV-1080 page at Planet-Groove
 JV-1080 editor librarian
 JV-1080 simplified operation tutorial
 JV-1080 page | full description with audio clips, manual, tips

JV-1080